Lord Edward Russell (1643 – 30 June 1714) was an English politician, known as Hon. Edward Russell until 1694. He married Francis Lloyd, a widow, in 1688. They had no children.

Edward Russell was son of William Russell, 1st Duke of Bedford (1616–1700). Edward was educated privately and at the University of Padua. At the time of the 1st Duke's death, Edward was the oldest surviving son, but the dukedom passed instead to Edward's nephew, the young Wriothesley Russell, 2nd Duke of Bedford. This was because Wriothesley was the son of Edward's elder brother William Russell, Lord Russell.

Edward Russell represented Tavistock in Parliament from 13 February 1679 to 23 March 1683. Russell was appointed Custos Rotulorum of Caernarvonshire in 1689 at the Glorious Revolution, and was Treasurer of the Chamber from 1694 to 1702. He was briefly the Lord Lieutenant of Bedfordshire, Lord Lieutenant of Cambridgeshire, Lord Lieutenant of Middlesex, and Custos Rotulorum of Middlesex from 1700 until 1701, when his nephew Wriothesley Russell, 2nd Duke of Bedford reached his majority and assumed those offices.

References

|-

|-

1642 births
1714 deaths
Whig (British political party) MPs
Members of the Parliament of England for Tavistock
English MPs 1679
English MPs 1680–1681
English MPs 1681
English MPs 1689–1690
English MPs 1690–1695
English MPs 1695–1698
English MPs 1698–1700
English MPs 1701
English MPs 1701–1702
English MPs 1702–1705
British MPs 1708–1710
British MPs 1710–1713
Lord-Lieutenants of Bedfordshire
Lord-Lieutenants of Cambridgeshire
Lord-Lieutenants of Middlesex
Younger sons of dukes